Hajji Qush may refer to:
 Hajji Qareh
 Hajji Qushan